McDougle is a surname. Notable people with the surname include:

Dexter McDougle (born 1991), American football player
Jerome McDougle (born 1978), American football defensive end
Ryan McDougle (born 1971), American politician
Stockar McDougle (born 1977), American football offensive lineman